Motel Blue (also known as Blue Motel) is a 1997 thriller film  directed  by Sam Firstenberg and starring Sean Young.

Plot
Kyle Rivers has joined the Department of Defense as an investigator. Her first assignment is to do a background check on Lana Hawking, scientist for a top secret clearance.

Cast 
 Sean Young as  Lana Hawking
 Soleil Moon Frye as Agent Kyle Rivers
 Rob Stewart as  Agent Daniel Larimer
 Robert Vaughn as  Chief MacIntyre
 Spencer Rochfort as  Steven Butler
  Barry Sattels  as  Wayne Hawking
 Seymour Cassel as  Capistrano Minister
  Malcolm Yates  as  Dr. Jeremy Marks
 James Michael Tyler as  Oscar Bevins
 Lou Rawls as  Gospel Minister 
 John LaMotta as   Agent Sands 
 Sonya Eddy as   Motel Blue Maid

References

External links
 

1990s erotic thriller films
American erotic thriller films
Films directed by Sam Firstenberg
Films scored by Robert O. Ragland
1990s English-language films
1990s American films